Bratz is an American product line of fashion dolls and merchandise.

Bratz (video game), a 2002 video game based on the doll line
Bratz (film), a 2007 American musical comedy film
Bratz (TV series), a computer animated television series
Bratz (web series), a stop-motion web series

Bratz may also refer to:

Bratz (surname), a surname

See also
Brat (disambiguation)